Teke–Mbere is a proposed intermediate group of Bantu languages, coded Zone B.50–80 in Guthrie's classification, along with the erstwhile Mbundu language Songo. According to Nurse & Philippson (2003), they are:
Nzebi (B.50)
Mbete (B.60)
Teke (B.70–80)
Songo (H.20)

Ethnologue suggests that the unclassified Songo "dialect" of Yansi (B.80) may be the same as the Songo here.

Footnotes

References